Irula may refer to:

Irulas, a scheduled tribe of Tamil Nadu, India
Irula language, their language